SIr George Markham Giffard, PC (4 November 1813 – 13 July 1870) was an English barrister and judge.

Life
The fourth son of Admiral John Giffard and Susannah, daughter of Sir John Carter, he was born at his father's official residence in Portsmouth dockyard on 4 November 1813. He was educated at Winchester College and at New College, Oxford, where he was elected to a fellowship in 1832 and took the degree of BCL on 4 March 1841. 

While studying at Oxford, he played first-class cricket for Oxford University on four occasions between 1834 and 1836. He scored 128 runs in these matches, with a high score of 105 against the Marylebone Cricket Club at Lord's in 1835. 

As a bowler he took 7 wickets, on one occasion taking a five wicket haul.

Giffard entered the Inner Temple, of which he eventually became a bencher, and was called to the bar in November 1840. He obtained an equity practice and was a leading chancery junior counsel. In 1859, he became a Queen's Counsel and attached himself to the court of Vice-chancellor Sir William Page Wood.

When Vice-Chancellor Wood in March 1868 became a Lord Justice of Appeal, Giffard succeeded him and was again his successor on his promotion from the Court of Appeal as Lord Chancellor, when he also became a member of the Privy Council. After an extended illness, he died at his house, 4 Prince's Gardens, Hyde Park, London. In 1853, he married Maria, second daughter of Charles Pilgrim of Kingsfield, Southampton.

As a barrister, he appeared in numerous cases, including the successful respondents in Liverpool Marine Credit Co v Hunter (1868) 3 LR Ch App 479.

As a judge, Giffard handed down the decision in In re Panama, New Zealand, and Australian Royal Mail Co (1870) 5 Ch App 318, generally regarded as the first case in English law to recognise the floating charge.  He also gave the judgment in Munns v Isle of Wight Railway Company (1870) 5 Ch App 414 in relation to the appointment of a receiver in favour of the holder of an equitable lien.

Arms

Notes

Attribution

1813 births
1870 deaths
Lawyers from Portsmouth
People educated at Winchester College
Alumni of New College, Oxford
English cricketers
Oxford University cricketers
Fellows of New College, Oxford
English barristers
Lords Justices of Appeal
Members of the Inner Temple
English King's Counsel
Knights Bachelor
Members of the Privy Council of the United Kingdom
Members of the Judicial Committee of the Privy Council
19th-century English lawyers